Neil Christopher Sanderson (born December 17, 1978) is a Canadian musician. He is the drummer, backing vocalist, and co-founder of the Canadian rock band Three Days Grace. He cites his influences as John Bonham, Danny Carey, and Stewart Copeland. He is also the co-founder of the American record label Judge and Jury.

Early years
Neil Sanderson was born on December 17, 1978 in Peterborough, Canada. Sanderson took up the piano before he started school. He had an avid interest in music and worked with different instruments while he was in elementary school. He became enamored of drums and started playing it at the age of 12.

He entered Norwood District High School in 1992. Before that, he attended Adam Scott C.V.I High School in Peterborough, where he met Adam Gontier when both of them were in grade 9. With bassist Brad Walst, they practiced writing and playing instruments. They created the band "Groundswell" with Phil Crowe and Joe Grant.

Sanderson was also the drummer for the band Thousand Foot Krutch from 1995 to 1997.

Groundswell reformed as Three Days Grace in 1997.

Career
Under the name "Three Days Grace" the band played various concerts and locations in Toronto and eventually signed a recording contract with the American label, Jive Records.

The band's first album, the self-titled Three Days Grace, was released in 2003. Three singles from the album, "I Hate Everything About You", "Just Like You", and "Home" became hits, each reaching No. 1 on the US Rock charts. This album has been certified "Platinum".

The band released a second album, One-X in 2006. That album reached fifth place on the US Billboard 200. Three singles from that album "Animal I Have Become", "Pain", and "Never Too Late" also reached first place on the US Rock charts. This album has also been certified "Platinum".

In 2006 Three Days Grace won an American Billboard "Song of the Year" award.

In 2006, Three Days Grace served as the opening act for the Rolling Stones in Saskatchewan. Three Days Grace has toured in the United States, Canada, Australia, Brazil, Europe, and Japan.

Speaking of the band's comeback from problems in 2007 (when a band member spent time in rehab) Sanderson said, "Now it's all about maintaining that communication, and it makes [touring] so much easier and a so much more enjoyable experience."

Sanderson was thrilled by the success of Three Days Grace. Speaking in Greensboro, North Carolina during their 2008 tour, he said: "We get to blow stuff up onstage now. We like to put in as much production and lights as we can. The seizure factor has gone way up." Speaking of the band's move to larger playing sites, he continued "It's great to be able to see everybody in a smaller place. But the same people who were there in the early days are still there for us." Speaking of fan response to album songs, he said: "[W]e also play a lot of album tracks, and the crowd sings along just as much for those. These days, you have to make an awesome album. I think we're getting back to where people want to hear real stuff, since so much is contrived these days."

In 2009 the band released the album Life Starts Now. It was initially listed at number three on the US Billboard 200.

Sanderson, along with Canadian songwriter Casey Marshall, were part owners of an artist development company and songwriting collective, Püblicwürks, based in Toronto and Nashville.

Sanderson is also working with Lukas Rossi on a project called King City.

Sanderson is the co-founder of the record label Judge and Jury along with producer Howard Benson.

Critical reaction
Sin Lucas, writing in The Silver Tongue said "It's hard to pick a highlight ... but the drum solo by Neil Sanderson was nothing short of spectacular." A reviewer for Electric City wrote of Sanderson's "impressive chops and accuracy." But Nikki M. Mascali of The Weekender wrote of the same performance "Though an interesting concept, it was an unnecessary lull in the show."

Philanthropy
Sanderson joined The Herbie Fund charity in 2007 when he met the president of Operation Herbie, Liisa Palokoski. In addition, he started a charity fund called, "Herbie Rocks". In 2017, he travelled to Kenya with World Vision to film a mini-documentary raising awareness of some of the challenges accessing clean drinking water. He also created the 3DG Kenya project and Mountain of Hope to help raise funds and awareness of the needs. In 2018, Sanderson opened up about his battles with anxiety at the fifth annual Friday Night Lights fundraiser for Team 55 Let's Tackle Suicide Awareness and the Canadian Mental Health Association.

Discography

Three Days Grace (2003)
One-X (2006)
Life Starts Now (2009)
Transit of Venus (2012)
Human (2015)
Outsider (2018)
Explosions (2022)

Other appearances

References

1978 births
Living people
Canadian Christians
Canadian heavy metal drummers
Canadian male drummers
Canadian rock drummers
Musicians from Peterborough, Ontario
Three Days Grace members
20th-century Canadian drummers
21st-century Canadian drummers
20th-century Canadian male singers
20th-century Canadian male musicians
21st-century Canadian male singers